Meme Ditshego (born May 1965), is a South African actress. She is best known for the roles in the television serials such as; Ga Re Dumele and The Coconuts.

Personal life
Ditshego was born in May 1965 in South Africa. She matriculated from high school in 1984.

She is married to fellow actor Samson Khumalo.

Career
In 1986, she started her acting career with theatre performances. She participated in Township theatre and later joined with the Sibonile Players. Under them, she played the lead role in the play Antigone. Then she joined with the Performing Arts Council of the Transvaal and involved in school programs from 1989 to 1993. Later in 1992, she started to work in children's theatre where she performed in the Afrikaans satirical play Don Gxubane Onner die Boere produced by Charles J. Fourie. In 2000s, she performed in the stage productions such as; Acropolis Café (2005), The Amen Corner (2008), and MacBeki (2009).

In 1997, she made television debut with the SABC2 Afrikaans drama mystery serial Sterk Skemer by playing the role "Elsie". Then in 2002, she made the role "Ma Thandi" in the second season of SABC1 education serial Soul Buddyz. In 2006, she acted in the CBC drama serial Jozi-H with the role "Gladys". Meanwhile, she also appeared in the soap opera Muvhango with the role "Ausi Ntsoaki".

In 2007, she appeared on the season two of the SABC2 comedy series Kompleks with a minor role. In 2008, she joined with the M-Net sitcom The Coconuts and played the role "Joyce Mlambo" until 2009 in both season one and two. In 2010, she played the role "Josephine Ratau" in the SABC2 sitcom Ga Re Dumele. Her role became very popular among the public, where she continued to play the role until the end of season 6 for six consecutive years. For her role, she later won the Best Actress Award in TV Comedy category at the South African Film and Television Awards (SAFTAs) in 2012. For the same award at the 2014 SAFTAs, she was again nominated for her role. In the meantime, she joined with the SABC3 sitcom Safe as Hauser's and played the role of "Dotty Sithole" in 2013.

In the same year, she joined with two more television serials: SABC2 serial Geraamtes in die Kas with the role "Aunt Ethel", and third season of Mzansi Magic soap opera Zabalaza with the role "Winnie". In 2017, she played the role "Brenda" in the Mzansi Magic serial Imposter. In the same year, she appeared in the e.tv telenovela Broken Vows with the role "Dr Machaka". Then in 2021, she joined with the SABC2 comedy drama serial Ak'siSpaza and played the role "Refiloe".

Filmography

References

External links
 IMDb

1965 births
Living people
South African film actresses
21st-century South African actresses
South African television actresses
South African stage actresses